The Angel of the Night (French: L'ange de la nuit) is a 1944 French drama film directed by André Berthomieu and starring Jean-Louis Barrault, Michèle Alfa and Henri Vidal.

The film's sets were designed by the art directors Lucien Aguettand and Raymond Nègre.

Main cast
 Jean-Louis Barrault as Jacques Martin
 Michèle Alfa as Geneviève
 Henri Vidal as Bob
 Gaby André as Simone
 Yves Furet as Hugues
 Claire Jordan as Claudie
 Lydie Vallois as Jeanine
 Cynette Quero as Hélène
 René Fluet as Pierre
 Manuel Gary as Roland
 Albert Morys as François
 Alice Tissot as Mme Robinot
 Simone Signoret as Une étudiante
 Pierre Larquey as Heurteloup

References

Bibliography 
 Dayna Oscherwitz & MaryEllen Higgins. The A to Z of French Cinema. Scarecrow Press, 2009.

External links 
 

1944 films
French drama films
1944 drama films
1940s French-language films
Films directed by André Berthomieu
Pathé films
French black-and-white films
1940s French films